Streatham Common railway station is in Streatham in south London,  from , and in Travelcard Zone 3.

The station is managed by Southern who also operate trains from the station. Direct trains from the station run to Victoria, London Bridge, East Croydon, Shepherds Bush, and Milton Keynes Central. Southern consider the station to be the 6th busiest station on their 158 station network as it receives 12,932 passenger journeys a day, totalling 4,655,520 per year. The Office of Rail and Road figures are lower at 3,827,296.

The station has four platforms, but only platforms 1 and 2 are in daily use; platforms 3 and 4 are normally for passing Express trains, but they are occasionally used during engineering work or major disruption. Step free access to both platforms and both station entrances is available.

History 

The Balham Hill and East Croydon line was constructed by the London Brighton and South Coast Railway (LB&SCR) as a short-cut on the Brighton Main Line to London Victoria, avoiding Crystal Palace and Norwood Junction.

Opening and renaming
The station was opened on 1 December 1862, then named Greyhound Lane station; however all reports of an 1863 accident in The Times newspaper refer to it occurring near "Streatham-common station", and it has been officially known by the latter name since 1870.

Fatal accident
On 29 May 1863 the 5:00 p.m. Brighton express train derailed near the station. The train was carrying two companies of the 2nd Battalion Grenadier Guards, 150 men in all, returning from the rifle range at Eastbourne along with other civilian passengers.

As the train entered the curved track leading into the station complex it derailed, causing the carriages to catapult over the locomotive and its boiler to explode with such force that the driver and fireman were thrown into a nearby field. The locomotive and carriages came to rest at the bottom of the embankment adjacent to the track.

Three people, Eliza Chilver, Private Charles Stone, and Private George Blundin were killed on impact. A fourth, John Salmon the engine driver, subsequently died of his injuries. In total 59 people were injured, 36 of whom were Guardsmen. Many of those hurt suffered life changing injuries, including amputations, and third degree burns.

As the accident involved a troop train it received considerable press coverage, The British Newspaper Archive lists 260 articles on the subject, but many of these are syndicated versions of articles produced by the London newspapers. The Times (London) noted in its 4 July 1863 edition that "Had it been Sydney Smith's famous bishop who had been maimed in this sad accident, greater interest could hardly have been excited in the minds of the public." In all eight articles appeared in The Times newspaper between 30 May and 2 July 1863.

Queen Victoria sent a telegram of condolence to the Grenadier Guards, and the Prince of Wales regularly sent messengers to the Hospitals caring for the wounded enquiring about their condition.

An inquest began in June 1863 at the Pied Bull public house on Streatham High Road, which concluded on 1 July 1863. The inquest jury returned the following verdict "The deceased persons severally came by their deaths from accident, and we, the jury, are of the opinion that it was attributable to the high speed at which the express trains run over the line from Croydon to Victoria. The jury would urge the directors of the London and Brighton company the necessity of allowing more time for the performance of the journey, and that careful attention should be given to the coupling of the trains."

Station buildings
The handsome station building was rebuilt by the London Brighton and South Coast Railway in 1903, when the lines were quadrupled. In 1912 the lines were electrified. It is now an attractive Edwardian vernacular arts and crafts style with prominent gables, clay tiles and long canopies. The station was taken over by the Southern Railway at the Grouping in 1923, becoming part of British Railways' Southern region upon nationalisation of the railways in 1948. The station was hit by at least two bombs dropped by the Zeppelin L31 on 23 September 1916. Damage caused by these bombs was still visible on the Eardley Road side of the station in the 1970s. Records in National Archives show bomb damage to nearby houses in Estreham, Natal, and Conyers Roads. A Miss Elizabeth (Bessie) Mitchell who lived at 59 Conyers Road until 1970s remembered her windows were blown out by Zeppelin raid. Some pics regarding funerals of busmen killed in raid at Telford Avenue can be found in 'Streatham. Pictures from the Past', published by Streatham Society in 1983.

Rebuilding of the Streatham Vale entrance
The station's second entrance on the road bridge serving Streatham Vale which had been closed and abandoned for decades, was rebuilt and reopened as a result of a 20-year campaign led by Streatham Vale Property Occupiers Association members Charlie Ruff and Alan Bedford. The entrance was officially opened by Transport Minister Tom Harris MP, Streatham MP Keith Hill, and the Mayor of Lambeth on 14 May 2007.

Ticket barriers
Ticket barriers were installed May 2009 to both entrances to curb fraudulent travel and improve security at the station.

Step-free access
Lifts enabling step free access to platforms 1 and 2, along with a DDA compliant ramp on platform 4 were installed in July and August 2009.

Bridge demolition and platform extension
Beginning in October 2012 and ending on 10 May 2013 Greyhound Lane and Streatham Vale were closed to enable the extension of platforms 1 and 2 of the station to accommodate 10 car trains, this required the complete demolition and replacement of the Northern section of the station's road bridge. The closure caused severe difficulties for local businesses and residents, leading directly to 15 job losses. A campaign led by local businessman Anthony Ellis produced hardship payments for 44 businesses, the foundation of the Streatham Bridge Business Association, and the acceleration of the works programme resulting in the early reinstatement of the bridge.

Services 
All services at Streatham Common are operated by Southern using  EMUs.

The typical off-peak service in trains per hour is:
 2 tph to  via 
 2 tph to 
 1 tph to  via 
 3 tph to 
 2 tph to 

Connections
London Buses routes 60 and 118 and night route N133 serve the station.

References

External links 

Railway stations in the London Borough of Lambeth
Former London, Brighton and South Coast Railway stations
Railway stations in Great Britain opened in 1862
Railway stations served by Govia Thameslink Railway
Streatham
1862 establishments in England